Yurii Ivanovych Chekan (born in 1960, in Uzhgorod) is a Ukrainian musicologist, Doctor of art history, and member of the National Union of Composers of Ukraine.

Biography
He was born on February 8, 1960, in the city of Uzhgorod, Transcarpathia, Ukraine.

In 1984, he graduated from the Faculty of History and Theory at the Kyiv Conservatory, and later in 1992, he completed postgraduate studies with the PhD thesis "Historical-functional studies of musical works (on the example of Tchaikovsky's Sixth Symphony)." In 2011, having defended his dissertation - "Intonation of the world as a category of historical musicology," he received his Doctor of Arts. Meanwhile, in 2001, he graduated from Taras Shevchenko Kyiv National University's, Institute of International Relations with a master's degree in International Law.

Work experience

Yuriy Chekan worked as a teacher of theoretical disciplines at the Uzhgorod music school (1984),  later a senior lecturer, Associate Professor and Head of the Department of theory and history of music at the Nizhyn Pedagogical Institute (1986-2000). He was an associate professor and acting professor at the National Music Academy of Ukraine beginning in 2000. He taught at the Kyiv Slavic University, the Glier school, and the Luhansk Academy of Culture and Arts. In addition, from 1996 to 2000, he was editor-in-chief of Art-line magazine; 2000-2002 head of the information and analytical department of the Foundation for assistance and development of the arts, 2003-2004 legal adviser to the editorial board of the magazine "Knizhnik-Review," 2004-2012 - director and editor-in-chief of LLC "Vremya Publishing House," director of the A. Shtogarenko Charitable Foundation (2002-2005), and administrator of the National Chamber Ensemble "Kyiv soloists" (2015-2016). He ran for the rector of NMAU in an election.  In the first round (September 20, 2018), he received 111 votes (22.3%), second place out of six candidates. In the second round, 141 votes (28.3%) were cast for the candidacy of Yurii Chekan, and Maxim Tymoshenko was elected rector.

Research activities

Yurii Chekan is a co-author (together with O. Zinkevych) of the textbook "Music Criticism." He is the co-author of books (together with O. Chekan) on the culture of Ukrainian gypsies "Romano Drom." He wrote the monograph "Intonation image of the world" (K., 2009). He is the author of over 50 scientific articles, over 500 music-critical articles, and more than 20 booklets for CDs with recordings of Ukrainian music.

Awards
On March 22, 2013, Yuri Ivanovich was awarded the Prize named after M.V. Lysenko for musicological works of 2007-2012 and achievements in pedagogical activity.

See also
Musicology
Kyiv Conservatory
Taras Shevchenko National University of Kyiv

References

External links
Юрій Чекан

1960 births
Ukrainian musicologists
Kyiv Conservatory alumni
Living people